The Market Building in Penzance is a Grade I listed building situated at the top of Market Jew Street, Penzance.

History
The site of the Market Building was bought from the Manor of Alverton for £34 as one of the first acts of the Corporation of Penzance after James I granted the town a charter in 1614. The site housed a market building, a guildhall and Penzance's prison. With alterations and repairs, the buildings lasted until their replacement in the 1830s. In James Neild's survey of prisons, he wrote that the prison in the market building had been replaced in about 1805, but it has been suggested that he was mistaken.

Current building

Design
The Corporation of Penzance organised an architectural competition for the building of a new market building on the site of the original. Although H J Whiting of London won the competition, his design was deemed too expensive for the Corporation (at the time, local councils were subject to increasing Government control by the passing of the 1835 Municipal Corporations Act and it was decided to use a cheaper scheme). The second place design was widely unpopular and so the contract was awarded to Bristol architect William Harris instead. Whiting sued for damages when his design was not chosen and was give £300 compensation. Samuel Teulon was also among the unsuccessful architects.

The Market Building was designed to direct its users attention away from the vulgarity of the streets and the uninspired and often depressingly ugly uniformity of the town.

Built from granite ashlar, the building is crowned by a lead-covered dome and octagonal lantern which is visible from much of the town, and from neighbouring villages. The eastern end consists of four ionic columns with a portico known as tetrastyle and overlooks a main thoroughfare (once the A30) of Penzance and a statue of Humphry Davy (erected in 1872).

Construction, opening and use
The foundation stone was laid on 11 July 1836 and the building was opened by the Mayor of Penzance Richard Pearce on the day of Queen Victoria's Coronation, 28 June 1838, though it may have started trading two weeks earlier. The building originally housed a market in the western half of the building and the guildhall in the east. The basement below the guildhall originally contained cells for prisoners, while the first floor was used as a grammar school from 1867 to 1898. The upper storey of the western end housed the Corn Exchange which also served a dual purpose as a theatre. The building's dome was at one time home to the Penwith Natural History Society.

The eastern part of the building remained as the guildhall until St John's Hall ( to the west) was built on glebe land in Alverton and opened in 1867. The Penzance Grammar School (1789–1898) took over the council rooms and remained there until 1898 when it closed.

The building's west face was redesigned in 1925 with rounded corners to allow larger vehicles to turn the corner from Market Place and Market Jew Street.

Current state
Lloyds Bank took over the western half of the building in 1925 when they shortened it by some 15 feet and modified the entrance. The bank bought the building from the Borough of Penzance in 1965 for £35,000. The western half of the building is still occupied by a Lloyds bank and the shop units in the eastern half are vacant. Despite the bank saying it would repair the building in 2014 after the roof began leaking and the interior suffered water damage, leaks have persisted and the condition continued to deteriorate. In 2019 in was placed on Historic England's Heritage at Risk Register due to plaster decay in the historic interior and timber rot due to damp.

Renovation and repair
In 2020, the Market Building was included in Penzance's bid for funding from the government's Future High Street Fund, though it was noted that it may have to be removed and included in the Towns Fund bid due to feasibility problems. In June 2021, Penzance was guaranteed £21.5m from the Town Deals Fund and a further £10.4m from the Future High Streets Fund. The next month, a pre-application was made for plans to repair the ground floor of the eastern side of the building.

Notes

References

External links

 Pastscapes
 

1838 establishments in England
Buildings and structures completed in 1838
Grade I listed buildings in Cornwall
Grade I listed markets and exchanges
Buildings and structures in Penzance
Industrial archaeological sites in Cornwall
Grade I listed government buildings